Lex Humphries (August 22, 1936 – July 11, 1994) was an American jazz drummer. He worked with two musicians known for mixing world music with jazz: Sun Ra and Yusef Lateef. As a member of Sun Ra's "Arkestra" he appeared in the film Space Is the Place.

Humphries played on the Giant Steps sessions with John Coltrane. The alternate versions of "Giant Steps", "Naima", and "Like Sonny" that he and Cedar Walton recorded with Coltrane were first released in 1974. He was also the first drummer in the Jazztet, appearing on their first album, Meet the Jazztet, in 1960.

He died in Philadelphia in 1994, aged 57. The cause of death was undisclosed, but according to fellow drummer Mickey Roker, he was distraught in his later years due to marital problems and being separated from his son.

Discography

As sideman
With Donald Byrd
Fuego (1959)
Byrd in Flight (1960)
At the Half Note Cafe (1963)
A New Perspective (1963)
With John Coltrane
Alternate Takes
The Heavyweight Champion: The Complete Atlantic Recordings
With Art Farmer and Benny Golson
Meet the Jazztet (Argo, 1960)
With Dizzy Gillespie
The Ebullient Mr. Gillespie (Verve, 1959)
Have Trumpet, Will Excite! (Verve, 1959)
With John Handy
No Coast Jazz (Roulette, 1960)
With Freddie Hubbard
Minor Mishap (Black Lion, 1989)
With Yusef Lateef
The Three Faces of Yusef Lateef (Riverside, 1960)
The Centaur and the Phoenix (Riverside, 1960)
Eastern Sounds (Prestige, 1961)
Jazz 'Round the World (Impulse!, 1963)
With Junior Mance
Junior (Verve, 1959)
With Wes Montgomery
So Much Guitar (1961)
With Duke Pearson
Profile (1959)
Tender Feelin's (1959)
Angel Eyes (1961)
Dedication! (1961)
With Sonny Red
Images (Jazzland, 1962)
With Sonny Stitt
Rearin' Back (Argo, 1962)
With Sun Ra
It's After the End of the World (MPS, 1970)
Black Myth/Out in Space (Motor Music, 1970 [1998])
Space Is the Place (soundtrack) (Evidence, 1972 [1993])Space Is the Place (Impulse!, 1973)
With Leon ThomasLeon Thomas in Berlin (Flying Dutchman, 1971) with Oliver Nelson
With McCoy TynerNights of Ballads & Blues (1963)
With Doug WatkinsSoulnik'' (New Jazz, 1960)

References

1936 births
1994 deaths
American jazz drummers
Musicians from New York City
Sun Ra Arkestra members
20th-century American drummers
American male drummers
Jazz musicians from New York (state)
American male jazz musicians
The Jazztet members
20th-century American male musicians